Vienna attack may refer to a series of attacks in Vienna including:

1981 Vienna synagogue attack
1985 Rome and Vienna airport attacks
2009 Vienna temple attack
2020 Vienna attack

See also
Siege of Vienna (disambiguation)
Battle of Vienna, Virginia, U.S., 1861